Mount Leman is located on the border of Alberta and British Columbia. It was named in 1918 after Gérard Leman, a Belgian General who led the defensive forces in the Battle of Liège during World War I. He was captured by German forces and held as a prisoner of war until 1917.

See also
 List of peaks on the British Columbia–Alberta border

References

Two-thousanders of Alberta
Two-thousanders of British Columbia
Canadian Rockies